The Skjervøy Bridge or Skattørsundet Bridge is a beam bridge in Skjervøy Municipality that crosses the Skattørsundet strait between the islands of Kågen and Skjervøya in Troms og Finnmark county, Norway. Skjervøy Bridge was opened in 1971. Together with the Maursund Tunnel, it connects the village of Skjervøy to the mainland.

References

External links
A picture of Skjervøy Bridge
Another picture of the bridge

Road bridges in Troms og Finnmark
Bridges completed in 1971
1971 establishments in Norway
Skjervøy